This is a list of airlines of New Brunswick which have an air operator's certificate issued by Transport Canada, the country's civil aviation authority. These are airlines that are based in Nova Scotia.

Current airlines

Defunct airlines

References

New Brunswick
Aviation in New Brunswick
Airlines